The following list of Carnegie libraries in New York City provides detailed information on United States Carnegie libraries in New York City, where 67 libraries were built with funds from one grant totaling $5,202,261 (worth some $ million today), awarded by the Carnegie Corporation of New York on December 8, 1899. Although the original grant was negotiated in 1899, most of the grant money was awarded as the libraries were built between 1901 and 1923. Carnegie libraries were built in all 5 boroughs.

Key

Carnegie libraries in Manhattan, the Bronx, and Staten Island

In Manhattan, the Bronx, and Staten Island, 39 libraries were built and became part of the New York Public Library.

Carnegie libraries in Manhattan

Carnegie libraries in Staten Island

Carnegie libraries in the Bronx

Carnegie libraries in Brooklyn

Brooklyn received $1.6 million ($ million today) of the entire grant to construct 21 libraries for the Brooklyn Public Library.

Carnegie libraries in Queens

Queens received $240,000 ($ million today) from the grant and built seven libraries for the Queens Public Library.

See also
 List of New York Public Library Branches
 List of Brooklyn Public Library Branches
 List of Queens Public Library branches

Notes

References

Note: The above references, while all authoritative, are not entirely mutually consistent. Some details of this list may have been drawn from one of the references without support from the others.

External links
Historic Districts Council pages on Carnegie libraries in Brooklyn, the Bronx, and Queens.

New York City
New York City-related lists
 
Babb, Cook and Willard buildings
 
New York City education-related lists
Carnegie libraries in New York City